Vollers is a corset manufacturer located in Portsmouth, England.

History
Started by Harry & Nelly Voller in 1899, they are one of the oldest corset manufacturers currently in existence. The company employs about 30 people in its Portsmouth factory, and is currently run by Ian & Corina Voller.

Over 50 overbust and underbust corset styles are available, in fabrics including satin, silk, PVC, denim, glitter, velvet and brocade. Many designs are based on 19th century patterns that date to the founding of the company. Vollers is one of the more popular wholesale lines available, carried by many corset shops in Europe and North America.

External links
Vollers Home Page
Vollers on Companies House
 Waist Trainers Comparison Chart
Waist Training Corsets

Corsetry
Companies based in Portsmouth
Clothing companies of the United Kingdom
1899 establishments in England
British companies established in 1899
Manufacturing companies established in 1899